Beith (ᚁ) is the Irish name of the first letter (Irish "letter": sing.fid, pl.feda) of the Ogham alphabet, meaning "birch". In Old Irish, the letter name was Beithe, which is related to Welsh bedw(en), Breton bezv(enn), and Latin betula. Its Proto-Indo-European root was *gʷet- 'resin, gum'.

Interpretation
The Auraicept na n-Éces contains the tale of the mythological origins of Beith

Peith (ᚚ) is a later addition to the Forfeda, a variant of Beith with a phonetic value of [p]. It replaced Ifín ᚘ, one of the "original" five Forfeda likely named initially pín (influenced by Latin pinus) with an original value [p] but whose phonetic value was altered to a vowel diphthong due to later medieval schematicism.

Bríatharogaim
In the medieval kennings, called Bríatharogaim (sing. Bríatharogam) or Word Oghams the verses associated with Beith are:

Féocos foltchaín: "Withered foot with fine hair" in the Bríatharogam Morann mic Moín

Glaisem cnis: "Greyest of skin"  in the Bríatharogam Mac ind Óc

Maise malach: "Beauty of the eyebrow"  in the Bríatharogam Con Culainn.

Notes 
While medieval and modern neopagan arboreal glosses (i.e. tree names) for the Ogham have been widely popularised (even for fade whose names do not translate as trees), the Old Irish In Lebor Ogaim (the Ogam Tract) also lists many other word values classified by type (e.g. birds, occupations, companies) for each fid. The filí (Old Irish filid, sing. fili) or poets of this period learned around one hundred and fifty variants of Ogham during their training, including these word-list forms.

Some of the notable Old Irish values of these for Beith include:

Enogam/Bird-ogam: besan "pheasant?" (this translation may be incorrect as the text predates the approximately sixteenth century introduction of pheasants to Ireland)

Dathogam/Colour-ogam: bán "white"

Ogam tirda/Agricultural ogam: biail "axe"

Danogam/Art-ogam: bethumnacht "livelihood"

Ogam Cuidechtach/Company Ogam: Bachlaid "Priests"

References

See also
Berkanan

Ogham letters